Ekkehard Tertsch (3 August 1906 – 30 August 1989) was Spanish-Austrian journalist and a Nazi Germany diplomat. By his wife Felisa Maria de Iciar del Valle Lersundi y del Valle, of the family of the counts of Lersundi, he was father of journalist and politician Hermann Tertsch.

Bibliography

References

1906 births
1989 deaths
Nazi Party members
Austrian Nazis
Spanish journalists
Austrian journalists
Austrian diplomats